Margate Sands railway station served the town of Margate, Kent, England from 1846 to 1926 on the Kent Coast Line.

History 
The station and connection line was first proposed in 1841 by the South Eastern Railway (SER), and surveyed by Robert Stephenson.

The station opened on 1 December 1846. The line took a convoluted route to reach Margate, running via Ashford, Canterbury and Ramsgate, and requiring a reversal at the latter. To save costs, the line was single-track beyond Canterbury and the original station building was a simple wooden structure. Shortly after opening, a passing loop was added on the line to alleviate congestion. A permanent building opened in 1859, costing £3,900. A chord was built at Ramsgate in 1863, which meant that trains could travel direct to the station from Canterbury without having to reverse. A refreshment room opened in 1873. The station's name was changed to Margate Sands on 1 June 1899.

The station closed on 2 July 1926, as part of the Southern Railway's plan to connect up and amalgamate the separate railway lines around Thanet built by the SER and others. Goods services were withdrawn at the station on 20 December, but the branch line continued to be used as a goods depot until 1972, 1976. The site was subsequently used as a car park, then as apartments and an amusement arcade.

Incidents
In August 1864, a train pulling into the station collided with one already at the platform. A carriage was pulled up during the collision and ended up resting on the station roof. One woman was killed in the accident.

References 
Citations

Sources

External links 

Disused railway stations in Kent
Former South Eastern Railway (UK) stations
Railway stations in Great Britain opened in 1846
Railway stations in Great Britain closed in 1926
1846 establishments in England
1926 disestablishments in England